Until December 31, 2006, Denmark was divided into 13 counties (amter), and 270 municipalities (kommuner). See List of municipalities of Denmark for the subdivision into 5 regions and 98 municipalities from January 1, 2007. The easternmost land in Denmark, the small Ertholmene archipelago, area 39 hectares (0.16 square miles), normally only mentioned by the name of its largest islet, Christiansø, which lies 11 miles (18 kilometers) to the northeast of Bornholm, was and is not part of a municipality or county or region but was and still is administered by the Ministry of Defence. Its population was 83 (January 1, 2018). 

Municipal seat is indicated if the name differs from the name of the municipality.

Århus Amt (Århus County, seat: Århus)
From 1 April 1948, Aa was changed to Å as a result of the Spelling reform (Danish Retskrivningsreformen). Aarhus municipal council and Aarhus county chose to use the letter Å instead of Aa, but it was optional for counties or municipalities or cities/towns whether they would keep or change the original spelling from before 1948. From January 2011, four (4) years after the counties were abolished, the politicians in the municipality chose to return to the original spelling Aa instead of Å. But the county of Århus from 1948 until it was abolished 1 January 2007 and the municipality Århus and city Århus from 1948 until 2010 was spelled Århus, and from January 2011 Aarhus again. Å (in capital) or å (in minor) and Aa/aa, where it is part of one word is placed as the last letter in the Danish alphabet, after the letters Æ/æ and Ø/ø, so the alphabetical order is Æ/æ,Ø/ø,Å/å- as (part of) a whole word also AA/aa (In Sweden, the order of the last 3 letters is Å/å,Ä/ä,Ö/ö, in Norway Ø/ø,Æ/æ,Å/å). So Aarhus and Århus is placed last, i.e. in a list, directory or encyclopedia in the Danish language.

Bornholms Amt (Bornholm County (1662-2002), seat: Rønne)
Bornholm County, which had existed since 1662, when it replaced Hammershus Len, was abolished as of Wednesday 1 January 2003, after the voters decided this in a referendum on the island on Tuesday May 29, 2001. This brought the number of counties down to 13, which were all abolished as of 2007. It was merged with the municipalities on the island to form one municipality, Bornholm Regional Municipality. This merger was not a part of the structural reform that merged most of Denmark's municipalities and other entities in the public sector a few years later. From 2003-2006 (4 years) it also had the responsibilities of a county, after that becoming part of Region Hovedstaden. The 5 municipalities that existed from 1970 until 2002 were:

Aakirkeby
Allinge-Gudhjem
Hasle
Nexø
Rønne

Frederiksberg Kommune (Frederiksberg Municipality, seat: Frederiksberg)
Frederiksberg Municipality was never a part of a county. Instead, it also held county privileges. But after 1 January 2007 it has lost its county privileges and is part of Region Hovedstaden.

Frederiksborg Amt (Frederiksborg County, seat: Hillerød)

Fyns Amt (Funen County, seat: Odense)

Københavns Amt (Copenhagen County, seat: Glostrup)
The borders of Copenhagen County surrounded the municipalities of Copenhagen and Frederiksberg but did not include them.

Københavns Kommune (Copenhagen Municipality, seat: Copenhagen)
Copenhagen Municipality was not part of a county. Instead it held county privileges of its own. But these privileges were lost when the municipality became part of Region Hovedstaden January 1, 2007.

Nordjyllands Amt (North Jutland County, seat: Aalborg)

Ribe Amt (Ribe County)

Ringkjøbing Amt (Ringkjøbing County, seat: Ringkøbing)

Roskilde Amt (Roskilde County)

Storstrøms Amt (Storstrøm County, seat: Nykøbing Falster)

Sønderjyllands Amt (South Jutland County, seat: Aabenraa)

Vejle Amt (Vejle County)

Vestsjællands Amt (West Zealand County, seat Sorø)

Viborg Amt (Viborg County)

External links
Maps (pdf) of local Government administration 1660-2007.Vælg et årstal:Select a year 

 
Former subdivisions of Denmark
Municipalities
Denmark
Mun
Municipalities (1970–2006)